Indopadilla is a genus of jumping spiders first described by J. T. D. Caleb, P. M. Sankaran and K. S. Nafin in 2019. It was placed into the tribe Baviini in the Salticoida clade of Salticinae. Several species have been transferred from the genus Bavia.

Species
 it contains fourteen species:
I. annamita (Simon, 1903) – China, Vietnam
I. bamilin Maddison, 2020 – Malaysia (Borneo)
I. darjeeling Caleb & Sankaran, 2019 (type) – India
I. insularis (Malamel, Sankaran & Sebastian, 2015) – India
I. kahariana (Prószyński & Deeleman-Reinhold, 2013) – Indonesia (Borneo)
I. kodagura Maddison, 2020 – India
I. nesinor Maddison, 2020 – Singapore
I. redunca Maddison, 2020 – Malaysia (Borneo)
I. redynis Maddison, 2020 – Malaysia (Borneo)
I. sabivia Maddison, 2020 – Malaysia (Borneo)
I. sonsorol (Berry, Beatty & Prószyński, 1997) – Caroline Is.
I. suhartoi (Prószyński & Deeleman-Reinhold, 2013) – Indonesia (Borneo)
I. thorelli (Simon, 1901) – Indonesia (Sulawesi)
I. vimedaba Maddison, 2020 – Singapore, Malaysia (Borneo)

See also
 Bavia
 Stagetillus
 Padillothorax
 List of Salticidae genera

References

Further reading

Salticidae genera